The Miss Nicaragua 2012 pageant, was held on March 17, 2012 in Managua, after weeks of events.  At the conclusion of the final night of competition, The winner will represent Nicaragua at Miss Universe 2012. The rest of the finalists would enter in different pageants.

Placements

Special awards

 Most Beautiful Face - Diriamba - Alejandra Borge
 Miss Congeniality - Bluefields - Ivy Hunter
 Miss Photogenic - Leon - Keykoll Montalván
 Best Smile - Diriamba - Alejandra Borge
 Miss Fitness - Managua - Claudia Cuadra Cardenal
 Miss Popularity -  Masaya - Farah Eslaquit  (by Text votes of Llamadas Heladas®)

Official Contestants

Trivia

 This was the last Miss Nicaragua show to be aired on Televicentro. Beginning with the next Miss Nicaragua pageant, VosTV assumed co-ownership of the pageant along with Silhuetas Models S.A, and as a result began televising the pageant.

.

Judges

 Carlos Mejia Godoy - Nicaraguan Composer & Singer
 Ashley Lauren Kerr - Fashion Designer
 Eduardo Guevara - Representative of Delta Air Lines, Inc.
 Graciela Fontecha - Puerto Rican Beauty Queen's Coach
 Luis Morales Alonso - Director of National Culture Institute
 Dra. Yelrana Pereira - Regional Manager of FABRIZIO GIANNONE©
 Dr. Luis Raez - Vice-President of CONANCA

.

Special Guests

 Luis Pastor Gonzalez - "La Cumbia Chinandegana" & "Como te quiero Nicaragua"

.

References

Miss Nicaragua
2012 in Nicaragua
2012 beauty pageants